Pierre Auguste Hippolyte Gomot (October 12, 1838 – November 8, 1927) was a French politician of the French Third Republic. He was minister of agriculture (November 9, 1885 – January 7, 1886) in the government of Henri Brisson. He was a member of the Chamber of Deputies of France from 1881 to 1889 and the Senate of France from 1891 until his death.

References

Sources 
 
 « Pierre Gomot », dans le Dictionnaire des parlementaires français (1889-1940), sous la direction de Jean Jolly, PUF, 1960.

External links
  Notice du Ministère de l'Agriculture

1838 births
1927 deaths
French Ministers of Agriculture